Vrhe may refer to any of the following settlements in Slovenia:
Vrhe, Celje
Vrhe, Novo Mesto
Vrhe, Slovenj Gradec
Vrhe, Zagorje ob Savi
Vrhe, Trbovlje